Neriene montana (syn. Linyphia montana) is a species of spider belonging to the family Linyphiidae. With a holarctic distribution, it is found throughout northern Europe.

The body length excluding legs is about 4 to 7 mm in both sexes, males having a slimmer abdomen. The carapace is dark brown with a darker midline and margins. The abdomen is marked with a broad brown folium with pale speckles and small indentations, surrounded by a pale area. The legs are yellow-brown with many annulations which, along with its size, help to distinguish N. montana from similar species. It builds a hammock-shaped web among bushes or low vegetation, on tree trunks, or under logs, which it rests beneath.

References

External links
Neriene montana, Spider and Harvestman Recording Scheme website
Neriene montana, eurospiders.com

Linyphiidae
Spiders of Europe
Spiders described in 1757
Taxa named by Carl Alexander Clerck
Holarctic spiders